The Guggilihorn is a mountain of the Swiss Pennine Alps, located south of Simplon in the canton of Valais. It lies on the range east of the Weissmies, between the Laggintal and the Zwischbergental.

References

External links
 Guggilihorn on Hikr

Mountains of the Alps
Mountains of Switzerland
Mountains of Valais